The world records in life saving are ratified by ILS, the International Life Saving Federation. Records can be set by registered competitors in the open category, as well as in youth and masters age groups. Youth ranges from 15 to 18 years of age. Masters start at age 30, and competitors are bracketed into five-year age groups to promote fair competition. The 100m Obstacle Swim is an event only available to senior masters (50 years and above).

Men

200m Obstacle Swim

50m Manikin Carry

100m Manikin Carry with Fins

100m Manikin Tow with Fins

200m Super Lifesaver

100m Rescue Medley

100m Obstacle Swim

Women

200m Obstacle Swim

50m Manikin Carry

100m Manikin Carry with Fins

100m Manikin Tow with Fins

200m Super Lifesaver

100m Rescue Medley

100m Obstacle Swim

See also
 Lifesaving (sport)
 Lifesaving at the World Games
 Lifesaving
 Surf lifesaving

References

External links
 World Records on ILS web site
 European Records on ILS web site

Lifesaving
life saving
Life saving
Life saving
Life saving